Xenonauts 2 is an upcoming turn-based tactics video game developed by Goldhawk Interactive. It is the sequel to 2014's Xenonauts.

Gameplay
Xenonauts 2 is a turn-based tactics video game.

Synopsis
Xenonauts 2 takes place in an alternate history timeline during the Cold War, rather than being a chronological sequel to Xenonauts. Though like its predecessor, Xenonauts 2 is inspired by X-COM: UFO Defense.

Development
In 2015, Goldhawk Interactive began prototyping and designing a potential sequel to their 2014 game Xenonauts. At the time, the possibility of Xenonauts 2 becoming their next project was still under evaluation.

The game is being developed using the Unity game engine. It will make use of 3D graphics rather than the 2D sprites of its predecessor. The development team's main concern with the transition to 3D graphics was whether they could create an art style that looked good and replicated the sprites from the original game. The use of 3D graphics would enable features such as objects with physics behavior and rotating the camera angle.

Setting the game in an alternate timeline meant that humanity would not possess the advanced alien technology from Xenonauts. The developers believed that this decision gave them the freedom to alter the story, setting and enemies to craft a more interesting game. They also set out to redesign the aliens for the sequel. Project lead, Chris England remarked that he wanted them to be both visually and mechanically more interesting than in Xenonauts.

Release
In February 2016, Goldhawk officially announced Xenonauts 2, with the game scheduled to be released in 2017. In November 2016, Goldhawk began distributing free development builds of Xenonauts 2 with fortnightly updates. The demo was later released on distribution service GOG.com in February 2017. They wanted to get feedback from the player community before charging for an in-development version of the game through the Steam Early Access program. Goldhawk launched a Kickstarter crowdfunding campaign in July 2018, the funding goal was reached within 8.5 hours. A closed beta was released on November 28, 2018, for Kickstarter backers who pledged £25 or more. In the announcement of the closed beta, the developers stated that the game would enter Early Access in March 2019.

In October 2019, Goldhawk said that they were expecting a mid-January 2020 release on Steam Early Access, however as of November 2022, the release was still pending on the Steam platform.

References

External links
 

Alternate history video games
Early access video games
Cold War video games
Turn-based tactics video games
Upcoming video games
Video games about extraterrestrial life
Video games developed in the United Kingdom
Windows games
Windows-only games
Video game sequels